This is a family tree of Chinese monarchs covering the period of the Five Emperors up through the end of the Spring and Autumn period.

Five Emperors
The legendary Five Emperors were traditionally regarded as the founders of the Chinese state. The Records of the Grand Historian states that Shaohao did not accede to the throne while Emperor Zhi’s ephemeral and uneventful rule disqualify him from the Five Emperors in all sources. Other sources name Yu the Great, the founder of the Xia dynasty, as the last of the Five. Pretenders are italicized.

Xia dynasty 
This is a family tree for the Xia dynasty which ruled circa 2000–1750 BC. The historicity of the dynasty has sometimes been questioned, but circumstantial archaeological evidence supports its existence.

Shang dynasty
This is a family tree for the Shang dynasty, which ruled China proper between circa 1750 BC and 1046 BC. The Shang rulers bore the title Di (帝）

Zhou dynasty

This is a family tree for the Zhou dynasty, descendants of Duke Wu of Zhou who overthrew the last Shang ruler, thereby establishing the dynasty. Ruling from 1046 BC to 256 BC, it is notable as the longest dynasty in Chinese history, although the actual political and military control of China by the dynasty only lasted during the Western Zhou.

References 

Chinese monarchs
 
Dynasty genealogy